The Royal Norwegian Ministry of Culture and Equality (short name Kultur- og likestillingsdepartementet) is responsible for cultural policy, regulations and other matters related to the media and sports, and equality and non-discrimination. The ministry was established in 1982, as the Ministry of Cultural and Scientific Affairs. Until then, the Ministry of Church and Education Affairs had had the overriding responsibility for cultural affairs in Norway. It is led by the Minister of Culture and Equality Anette Trettebergstuen (Labour). The Secretary-General of the ministry is Kristin Berge. The ministry reports to the Storting.

History 
The Ministry of Churches and Education, which was also responsible for culture, was founded in 1818. Finally, in 1982, an independent Ministry of Culture was established under the name of Kultur- og vitenskapsdepartementet (Ministry of Culture and Science). Another restructuring of responsibilities in 1990 led to the formation of a Ministry of Churches and Culture (Kirke- og kulturdepartementet) and a Ministry of Education and Research (Utdannings- og forskningsdepartementet). In 1991 responsibility for the churches was handed over again from the Ministry of Culture to the now renamed Ministry for Churches, Education and Research (Kirke-, utdannings- og forskningsdepartementet). In 2002, the Ministry of Culture received the subject area again and was given the name Kultur- og kirkedepartementet.  

The ministry was called Kulturdepartementet from 2010 until the end of 2021. In 2019, responsibility for equality was transferred from the Ministry of Children and Family to the Ministry of Culture. On January 1, 2022, the ministry was renamed Kultur- og likestillingsdepartementet (Ministry of Culture and Equality).

Organisation
The ministry is led by the Minister of Culture and Equality Anette Trettebergstuen, who represents the Labour Party. The Secretary-General of the ministry is Kristin Berge. Gry Haugsbakken and Odin Adelsten Aunan Bohmann are state secretaries, and Oda Malmin is a political adviser.

Departments
The ministry is divided into six departments and an information unit.
Department of Civil Society and Sports
Department of Cultural Heritage
Department of Media and the Arts
Department for Equality, Non-discrimination and International Affairs
Department of Administrative Affairs
The Communication Unit

See also
Minister of Culture (Norway)
Politics of Norway

References

External links
 Official web site

 
Culture and Church Affairs
Norway
Ministries established in 1982
1982 establishments in Norway